The 2013 Campeonato Nacional Apertura began on 26 July and ended on 10 December. The tournament champion was O'Higgins which won its first Primera División de Chile title in 58 years’ history after beating Universidad Católica 1–0 in the final play-off played at the Estadio Nacional.

Standings

Results

Súper Final

Pre-Copa Libertadores Liguilla
Winner qualify for 2014 Copa Libertadores first stage (Chile 3).
Runner-up qualify for 2014 Copa Sudamericana first stage (Chile 4).

Semifinals

Final 

Universidad de Chile qualified to the 2014 Copa Libertadores. Deportes Iquique, as the runner-ups, qualified to the 2014 Copa Sudamericana.

References

External links
2013 Chilean Primera División season at Soccerway

Primera División de Chile seasons
Chile
Prim